Helgeland Hospital Trust is a health trust covering Helgeland in Nordland, Norway. It is part of Northern Norway Regional Health Authority and was established on 1 January 2002. The main facilities are in Mo i Rana, Mosjøen and Sandnessjøen Hospital. It has a polyclinic in Brønnøysund. The director is Hulda Gunnlaugsdottir.

External links
 Official website

 

Health trusts of Norway
2002 establishments in Norway
Companies based in Rana, Norway